Torkahpan (also Romanized as Torkahpān; also known as Torkapān) is a village in Palanganeh Rural District, in the Central District of Javanrud County, Kermanshah Province, Iran. At the 2006 census, its population was 126, in 28 families.

References 

Populated places in Javanrud County